The 2010 CAF Confederation Cup was the 7th edition of the CAF Confederation Cup, Africa's secondary club football competition organized by the Confederation of African Football (CAF). The winners played in the 2011 CAF Super Cup.

Schedule

Qualifying rounds

Preliminary round

|}

Byes: Primeiro de Agosto (Angola), Coton Sport FC (Cameroon), Haras El Hodood (Egypt), FC 105 (Gabon), FAR Rabat (Morocco), Stade Malien (Mali), Enyimba (Nigeria), AS Vita Club (Congo DR), Simba (Tanzania), Étoile Sahel (Tunisia), CS Sfaxien (Tunisia), ZESCO United (Zambia), Académica do Soyo (Angola)2, Panthère Sportive du Ndé FC (Cameroon) 3.

1 SC Villa withdrew. 
2 Académica do Soyo were drawn against the champions of São Tomé and Príncipe, but the São Toméan FA did not send a team. 
3 Panthère du Ndé were drawn against the champions of Benin, but the Beninese FA did not send a team.

First round

|}

Second round

|}
The Winners advance to a play-off against the losers of the Second Round of the Champions League

Play-off round

|}
The Winners advanced to the Group Stage

Group stage

Group A

Group B

Knock-out stage

Bracket

Semifinals

|}

Final

FUS Rabat won 3–2 on aggregate.

Top goalscorers

The top scorers from the 2010 CAF Confederation Cup are as follows:

See also
 2010 CAF Champions League
 2011 CAF Super Cup

References
http://www.cafonline.com/userfiles/file/CC_fixturescomplete_2010_ENGpdf.pdf
Fixtures & results
Groups & standings

 
2010
2